Vaynor Park is a country house in a landscaped park, standing on  high ground to the south-west of Berriew village,  in the historic county of Montgomeryshire, now Powys. The origins of the house date from the mid-15th century, but the house was extensively re-built in brick about 1640. The house was further re-modelled in 1840–1853 by Thomas Penson. The house is listed Grade II* and the garden and park is on the Cadw/ICOMOS Register of Parks and Gardens of Special Historic Interest in Wales

Early ownership
The substantial medieval house built for Edward ap Hywel ab leuan Llwyd is described by the poet Guto'r Glyn (c.1412 – c.1493) in the C15.

17th-century rebuilding
In the 1570s the house was purchased by Arthur Price, a son of Mathew Price of Newtown Hall. Arthur Price  was the Member of Parliament for Montgomery Boroughs from 1571 to 1572.  The house then passed down his granddaughter Bridget, who in 1633 had married George Devereux.

George Devereux was the son of Sir George Devereux of Sheldon Hall, Warwickshire and the nephew of Walter Devereux, Viscount Hereford. He played a leading part in Montgomeryshire politics and was a ‘recruiter’ M.P. for Montgomery in the Long Parliament (6 April 1647). He was suspended as a ‘delinquent’ the following May, but signed the Montgomeryshire declaration for Parliament on 20 May 1648. After the king's execution he remained in retirement till he began to sit on county committees in 1657 and accepted office as sheriff in 1658. Haslam attributes the building of the brick house shown in John Ingleby's watercolours to him around 1640, but it could also be after  the Civil War.

 Vaynor is one of only four big brick houses of its date in the county and is built in Flemish bond. John Ingleby's drawings show the back of the house with two storeys of eight bays beneath four equal gables. The west front, facing over a courtyard, had a five-bay centre flanked by hip-roofed wings two bays wide by one deep: this all looks like a re-working of c.1670. External chimneys on the side walls can be compared with  Llandrinio Hall of 1682.

After Sir George's death in 1682 (or possibly 1665), the house passed to his grandson Price Devereux (1664–1740), whose father had died young. Price was M.P. for Montgomery Boroughs until becoming the 9th Viscount Hereford in 1700. Following the death in 1748 of his son, the 10th Viscount, the Hereford viscountcy passed to a branch of the family in Nantcribba near Montgomery but the Vaynor property was bequeathed as part of the residual estate to his executor and lawyer Robert Moxon. In 1793 Robert Moxon's nephew left the house and estate to his sister Ann and her husband John Winder, since when it has descended in the Corbett-Winder family to the present owners.

The house is a Grade II* listed building and its garden and park is also listed, at Grade I, on the Cadw/ICOMOS Register of Parks and Gardens of Special Historic Interest in Wales.

John Ingleby's views of Vaynor 1796

 
In 1776 Thomas Pennant stayed with his friend Arthur Blayney at nearby Gregynog while making a tour through Montgomeryshire. When this Tour was included in the second edition of ‘‘Tour in Wales’‘ which was published in 1783, he only included a short description of Vaynor. He intended to revise the Montgomeryshire tour, and, as it was un-illustrated, he commissioned the artist in John Ingleby in 1794–6 to produce a series of watercolours of Montgomeryshire houses and churches. These watercolours are now in the National Library of Wales and included two watercolours of Vaynor. In one of these, Ingleby shows himself on horseback sketching Vaynor.    
Ingleby's watercolour shows the S W aspect of the house which now looks onto a rectangular court yard at the opposite end of which is a long stable block. The two forward wings of the house remain but the buildings to each side have been removed.

Rebuilding by Thomas Penson 1840–53

In the early 19th the Winder family had various schemes for rebuilding Vaynor. Plans exist of c1810  by Thomas Hopper for a Gothic extravaganza and a further scheme was submitted by Peter Frederick Robinson about 1820. However, in the mid-1830s John Lyon Winder opted for a more modest scheme by Thomas Penson the Montgomeryshire County Surveyor which preserved a greater portion of the interiors of the house. The style chosen was Jacobean, a reflection of taste changing from the austere medieval of earlier in the century towards more opulent decoration. So on the West, transom-and-mullion windows were inserted (replacing Georgian sashes) and given pediments, big shaped gables were substituted, and a carved porch with pilasters and a strapwork crest was added, to give an E plan. The chimneys were rebuilt with the tall brick shafts that were to characterize many of the estate houses and farms. Shaped gables to the E side, the outer bays with strapwork-crested bay-windows. Penson's remodeling is of convincing quality, and is particularly dramatic when viewed from below the terrace to the S.
Inside, the plan was reordered by Penson, but most of the fittings are those of the late C17, which is a tribute to him. In the hall a C17 carved overmantel from Crutched Friars. The library, whose l. part held the staircase, has a plaster ceiling and lovely woodwork to Penson's designs, excepting a mid-C17 overmantel, which has carved figures. In the drawing and dining rooms, ceilings by Penson (the latter based on that in the long gallery at Hardwick Hall), and in the latter a fireplace carved by Henry Street incorporating C17 pieces. The fine staircase, dog-leg, with its fluted pear-shaped balusters and bold bolection panelling, was reassembled – which might account for some crude details in the broken triangular pediments over the doorcases. In the study, late C17 bolection paneling.

The house stands at the E of a courtyard which had two-storey pavilions halfway down the side walls. The long C17 gatehouse and stables have scrolled gables which were lowered by Penson, who added three gables facing the house. The florid Elizabethan frontispiece on the outer side came last and was added by Samuel Pountney Smith of Shrewsbury, 1853.

Literature
 Alfrey J (2001), Rural Building in Nineteenth- Century North Wales: The Role of the Great Estate, Archaeologia Cambrensis. Vol 147, 1998, 199–216. 
 Cadw (1999) Register of Landscapes, Parks and Gardens of Special Historic Interest in Wales: Powys. Cardiff 
 Richard Haslam, A Note on the Architecture of Vaynor Park, Montgomeryshire Collections, Vol. 65, 1977.
 Pinhorn M.,  Vaynor, Berriew, Montgomeryshire, Montgomeryshire Collections, 65, 1977 esp. pp 35–37
 Scourfield R and Haslam R, (2013) Buildings of Wales: Powys; Montgomeryshire, Radnorshire and Breconshire, 2nd edition, Yale University Press, p. 84.
 Silvester, R. (2012) Mapping Montgomeryshire: Estate Maps from 1589 t0 1840, Montgomeryshire Collections, Vol. 100, pp 149–180
 Silvester, R. and Alfrey, J. Vaynor: a landscape and its buildings in the Severn Valley, in Estate Landscapes : Design, Improvement and Power in the Post-Medieval Landscape (Ed. Finch J and Giles K) Boydell press, Woodbridge 2008.  
 Peter Smith,(1988) Houses of the Welsh Countryside, Royal Commission on the Ancient and Historical Monuments of Wales, 2nd edition, .

See also
Berriew
Nantcribba
Garthmyl Hall, Berriew

References

External links
The Vaynor Shoot 
 Vaynor Park – family history 
 Vaynor Park Estate Records in the National Library of Wales 

Forests and woodlands of Powys
Buildings and structures in Powys
Houses in Powys
Grade II* listed buildings in Powys
Thomas Penson buildings and structures
Grade II* listed houses in Wales
Registered historic parks and gardens in Powys